The Yi or Nuosu people, Nuosu: , ; Hanzi transcription: ;  historically known as the Lolo, ; ;  are an ethnic group in China, Vietnam, Laos and Thailand. Numbering nine million people, they are the seventh largest of the 55 ethnic minority groups officially recognized by the People's Republic of China. They live primarily in rural areas of Sichuan, Yunnan, Guizhou, and Guangxi, usually in mountainous regions. The Liangshan Yi Autonomous Prefecture is home to the largest population of Yi people within mainland China, with two million Yi people in the region. For other countries, as of 1999, there were 3,300 Lô Lô people living in the Hà Giang, Cao Bằng, and Lào Cai provinces in Northern Vietnam.

The Yi speak various Loloish languages, closely related to Burmese. The prestige variety is Nuosu, which is written in the Yi script.

Location
Of the more than 9 million Yi people, over 4.5 million live in Yunnan Province, 2.5 million live in southern Sichuan Province and 1 million live in the northwest corner of Guizhou Province. Nearly all the Yi live in mountainous areas, often carving out their existence on the sides of steep mountain slopes far from the cities of China.

The altitudinal differences of the Yi areas directly affect the climate and precipitation of these areas. These striking differences are the basis of the old saying that "The weather is different a few miles away" in the Yi area. Yi populations in different areas are very different from one another, making their living in completely different ways.

Subgroups

Although different groups of Yi refer to themselves in different ways (including Nisu, Sani, Axi, Lolo, and Acheh) and sometimes speak mutually unintelligible languages, they have been grouped into a single ethnicity by the Chinese and the various local appellations can be classified into three groups:
Ni. The appellations of Nuosu, Nasu, Nesu, Nisu and other similar names are considered derivatives of the original autonym "" (Nip) appended with the suffix -su, indicating "people". The name "Sani" is also a variety of this group. Further, it is widely believed that the Chinese names 夷 and 彝 (both pinyin: Yí) were derived from Ni.
Lolo. The appellations of Lolo, Lolopu, etc. are related to the Yi people's worship of the tiger, as "lo" in their dialects means "tiger". "Lo" is also the basis for the Chinese exonym Luóluó 猓猓, 倮倮 or 罗罗. The original character 猓, with the "dog radical" 犭and a guǒ 果 phonetic, was a graphic pejorative, comparable to the Chinese name guǒran 猓然, "a long-tailed ape". Languages reforms in the PRC replaced the 猓 character in Luóluó twice. First by Luó 倮, with the "human radical" 亻and the same phonetic, but that was a graphic variant for luǒ 裸, "naked" and later by Luó 罗, "net for catching birds". Paul K. Benedict noted, "a leading Chinese linguist, has remarked that the name 'Lolo' is offensive only when written with the 'dog' radical.
Other. This group includes various other appellations of different groups of Yi. Some of them may be of other ethnic groups but are recognised as Yi by the Chinese. The "Pu" may be relevant to an ancient ethnic group Pu. In the legends of the Northern Yi, the Yi people conquered Pu and its territory in the northeastern part of the modern Liangshan.

(Groups listed below are sorted by their broad linguistic classification and the general geographic area where they live. Within each section, larger groups are listed first.)

History

According to Yi legend, all life originated in water and water was created by snowmelt, which as it dripped down, created a creature called the Ni. The Ni gave birth to all life. Ni is another name for the Yi people. It is sometimes translated as black because black is a revered color in Yi culture. Apu Dumu had three wives, each of whom had two sons. The six sons migrated to the area that is now Zhaotong and spread out in the four directions, creating the Wu, Zha, Nuo, Heng, Bu, and Mo clans. The Yi practiced a lineage system where younger brothers were treated as slaves by their elders, which resulted in a culture of migration where younger brothers constantly left their villages to create their own domains.

Guizhou kingdoms

The Heng clan divided into two branches. One branch, known as the Wumeng, settled along the western slope of the Wumeng Mountain range, extending their control as far west as modern day Zhaotong, Yunnan. The other branch, known as the Chele, moved along the eastern slope of the Wumeng Mountain range and settled to the north of the Chishui River. By the Tang dynasty (618–907), the Chele occupied the area from today Xuyong county in Sichuan to Bijie city in Guizhou. The Bu clan fragmented into four branches. The Bole branch settled in Anshun, the Wusa branch settled in Weining, the Azouchi branch settled in Zhanyi, and the Gukuge branch settled in northeast Yunnan. The Mo clan, descended from Mujiji, split into three branches. One branch known as the Awangren, led by Wualou, settled in southwest Guizhou and formed the Ziqi Kingdom. Wuake led the second branch, the Ayuxi, to settle near Ma'an Mountain south of Huize. Wuana led the third branch to settle in Hezhang. In the 3rd century AD, Wuana's branch split into the Mangbu branch in Zhenxiong, led by Tuomangbu, and Luodian in Luogen, led by Tuoazhe. By 300, Luodian covered over much of the Shuixi region. Its ruler, Mowang, moved the capital to Mugebaizhage (modern Dafang), where he renamed his realm the Mu'ege kingdom, otherwise known as the Chiefdom of Shuixi.

After the Eastern Han dynasty, the Shu of the Three Kingdoms conducted several wars against the ancestors of Yi under the lead of Zhuge Liang. They defeated the king of Yi,  (Mot Hop) and expanded their conquered territory in Yi area. After that, the Jin Dynasty succeeded Shu as the suzerain of Yi area but with weak control.

Yunnan kingdoms

Some historians believe that the majority of the kingdom of Nanzhao were of the Bai people, but that the elite spoke a variant of Nuosu (also called Yi), a Tibeto-Burman language closely related to Burmese. The Cuanman people came to power in Yunnan during Zhuge Liang's Southern Campaign in 225. By the fourth century they had gained control of the region, but they rebelled against the Sui dynasty in 593 and were destroyed by a retaliatory expedition in 602. The Cuan split into two groups known as the Black and White Mywa. The White Mywa (Baiman) tribes, who are considered the predecessors of the Bai people, settled on the fertile land of western Yunnan around the alpine fault lake Erhai. The Black Mywa (Wuman), considered to be predecessors of the Yi people, settled in the mountainous regions of eastern Yunnan. These tribes were called Mengshe (蒙舍), Mengxi (蒙嶲), Langqiong (浪穹), Tengtan (邆賧), Shilang (施浪), and Yuexi (越析). Each tribe was known as a zhao. In academia, the ethnic composition of the Nanzhao kingdom's population has been debated for a century. Chinese scholars tend to favour the theory that the rulers came from the aforementioned Bai or Yi groups, while some non-Chinese scholars subscribed to the theory that the Tai ethnic group was a major component, that later moved south into modern-day Thailand and Laos.

In 649, the chieftain of the Mengshe tribe, Xinuluo (細奴邏), founded the Great Meng (大蒙) and took the title of Qijia Wang (奇嘉王; "Outstanding King"). He acknowledged Tang suzerainty. In 652, Xinuluo absorbed the White Mywa realm of Zhang Lejinqiu, who ruled Erhai Lake and Cang Mountain. This event occurred peacefully as Zhang made way for Xinuluo of his own accord. The agreement was consecrated under an iron pillar in Dali. Thereafter the Black and White Mywa acted as warriors and ministers respectively.

In 704 the Tibetan Empire made the White Mywa tribes into vassals or tributaries.

In the year 737 AD, with the support of the Tang dynasty, the great-grandson of Xinuluo, Piluoge (皮羅閣), united the six zhaos in succession, establishing a new kingdom called Nanzhao (Mandarin, "Southern Zhao"). The capital was established in 738 at Taihe, (the site of modern-day Taihe village, a few miles south of Dali). Located in the heart of the Erhai valley, the site was ideal: it could be easily defended against attack and it was in the midst of rich farmland. Under the reign of Piluoge, the White Mywa were removed from eastern Yunnan and resettled in the west. The Black and White Mywa were separated to create a more solidified caste system of ministers and warriors.

Nanzhao existed for 165 years until A.D. 902. After 35 years of tangled warfare, Duan Siping of the Bai birth founded the Kingdom of Dali, succeeding the territory of Nanzhao. Most Yi of that time were under the ruling of Dali. Dali's sovereign reign lasted for 316 years until it was conquered by Kublai Khan. During the era of Dali, Yi people lived in the territory of Dali but had little communication with the royalty of Dali.

Kublai Khan included Dali in his domain, grouping it with Tibet. The Yuan emperors remained firmly in control of the Yi people and the area they inhabited as part of Kublai Khan's Yunnan Xingsheng at current Yunnan, Guizhou and part of Sichuan. In order to enhance its sovereign over the area, the Yuan dynasty set up a dominion for Yi, Luoluo Xuanweisi, the name of which means local appeasement government for Lolos. Although technically under the rule of the Yuan emperor, the Yi still had autonomy during the Yuan dynasty. The gulf between aristocrats and the common people increased during this time.

Ming and Qing dynasties

Beginning with the Ming dynasty, the Chinese empire expedited its cultural assimilation policy in Southwestern China, spreading the policy of gaitu guiliu ('replacing tusi (local chieftains) with "normal" officials'). The governing power of many Yi feudal lords had previously been expropriated by the successors of officials assigned by the central government. With the progress of gaitu guiliu, the Yi area was dismembered into many communities both large and small, and it was difficult for the communities to communicate with each other as there were often Han-ruled areas between them.

The Kangxi Emperor of the Qing dynasty defeated Wu Sangui and took over the land of Yunnan and established a provincial government there. When Ortai became the Viceroy of Yunnan and Guizhou during the era of Yongzheng Emperor, the policy of gaitu guiliu and cultural assimilation against Yi were strengthened. Under these policies, Yi who lived near Kunming were forced to abandon their convention of traditional cremation and adopt burial, a policy which triggered rebellions among the Yi. The Qing dynasty suppressed these rebellions.

After the Second Opium War (1856–1860), many Christian missionaries from France and Great Britain visited the area in which the Yi lived. Although some missionaries believed that Yi of some areas such as Liangshan were not under the ruling of Qing dynasty and should be independent, most aristocrats insisted that Yi was a part of China despite their resentment against Qing rule.

Modern era
 
Long Yun, a Yi, was the military governor of Yunnan, during the Republic of China rule on mainland China.

The Fourth Front Army of the CCP encountered the Yi people during the Long March and many Yi joined the communist forces.

After the establishment of the PRC, several Yi autonomous administrative districts of prefecture or county level were set up in Sichuan, Yunnan and Guizhou. With the development of automotive traffic and telecommunications, the communications among different Yi areas have been increasing sharply.

Yi people face systematic discrimination and abuse as migrant laborers in contemporary China.

Yi polities throughout history
Cuanmans 
Mu'ege Kingdom (circa 300–1279), afterwards known as the Chiefdom of Shuixi from 1279 to 1698 
Nanzhao Empire (738–937) 
Luodian Kingdom (羅甸國) of the Bole clan in present-day Luodian County, Yunnan 
Badedian Kingdom of the Mangbu Azhe clan in present-day Zhenxiong
Luogui Kingdom (羅鬼國) (10th century–1278) in Guizhou 
Ziqi Kingdom (Yushi) (自杞國) (1100–1260) of the Awangren clan in present-day Xingyi, Guizhou
Kingdom of Shu (1621–1629), a short-lived state during the She-An Rebellion

Language

 
The Chinese government recognizes six mutually unintelligible Yi languages, from various branches of the Loloish family:
Northern Yi (Nuosu 诺苏)
Western Yi (Lalo 腊罗)
Central Yi (Lolopo 倮倮泼)
Southern Yi (Nisu 尼苏)
Southeastern Yi (Sani 撒尼)
Eastern Yi (Nasu 纳苏)
Northern Yi is the largest with some two million speakers and is the basis of the literary language. It is an analytic language. There are also ethnically Yi languages of Vietnam which use the Yi script, such as Mantsi.

Many Yi in Yunnan, Guizhou and Guangxi know Standard Chinese and code-switching between Yi and Chinese is common.

Script
The Yi script was originally logosyllabic like Chinese and dates to at least the 13th century, but seems to be completely independent of any other known script. Until the early 20th century, usage of this script was primarily the domain of bimo priests for transmitting ritual texts from generation to generation. It was not until the mid-twentieth century that elite families in Liangshan began to use the script for non-religious purposes, such as letter writing.

There were perhaps 10,000 characters, many of which were regional, since the script had never been standardized across the Yi peoples. A number of works of history, literature and medicine, as well as genealogies of the ruling families, written in the Old Yi script are still in use and there are Old Yi stone tablets and steles in the area.

An attempt to romanize the script was made in the 1950s but it failed to gain traction. In the 1970s and 1980s, the traditional script was standardized into a syllabary. Syllabic Yi is widely used in books, newspapers, street signs, and education, although with increasing influence from Chinese.

Name
The Yi use a son-father patronymic naming system. The last character of the father's name transfers to become the first character of the son's name. The last character of the son's name is then used as the first character of the grandson's name. A complete Yi name is composed of the clan name, the branch clan name, the father's name, and the person's own name (ex. Aho Bbujji Jjiha Lomusse). Aho is the name of a tribe, Bbuji is the name of a clan, Jjiha is the father's name, and Lomusse is a personal name. The name therefore means Lomusse the son of Jjiha of the Bbujji clan of the Aho tribe. Within the clan he would just be called Lomusse and within the tribe he would be called Jjiha Lomusse.

This system can also be seen in the names of Nanzhao's rulers:

 Xinuluo
 Luosheng
 Shengluopi
 Piluoge
 Geluofeng
 Fengjiayi
 Yimouxun
 Xungequan
 Quanfengyou – sought to imitate Chinese practices and only went by Fengyou; broke tradition and named his son Shilong
 Shilong
 Longshun
 Shunhuazhen

This is a tradition closely tied to Tibeto-Burman traditions and suggests that the rulers of Nanzhao were not Tai people.

Culture

Gender
Descent and inheritance in Yi society was traditionally patrilineal and men were generally considered superior to women. Men practiced polygamy and levirate marriage. Women were excluded from oral genealogies. In certain locales, Yi women still lag behind men in terms of primary education and very few Yi women become educational instructors or political leaders. Yi women noticeably drank and smoked more than Han Chinese women.

Slavery
Traditional Yi society was divided into four castes, the aristocratic nuohuo/nzymo Black Yi, the commoner qunuo/quho White Yi, the ajia/mgajie, and the xiaxi/gaxy. The Black Yi made up around 7 per cent of the population while the White Yi made up 50 per cent of the population. The two castes did not intermarry and the Black Yi were always considered of higher status than the White Yi, even if the White Yi was wealthier or owned more slaves. The White and Black Yi also lived in separate villages. The Black Yi did not farm, which was traditionally done by White Yi and slaves. Black Yi were responsible only for administration and military activities. The White Yi were not technically slaves but lived as indentured servants to the Black Yi. The Ajia made up 33 per cent of the population. They were owned by both the Black and White Yi and worked as indentured laborers lower than the White Yi. The Xiaxi were the lowest caste. They were slaves who lived with their owners' livestock and had no rights. They could be beaten, sold, and killed for sport. Membership of all four castes was through patrilineal descent. The prevalence of the slave culture was so great that sometimes children were named after how many slaves they owned. For example: Lurbbu (many slaves), Lurda (strong slaves), Lurshy (commander of slaves), Lurnji (origin of slaves), Lurpo (slave lord), Lurha, (hundred slaves), Jjinu (lots of slaves).

Cases of the caste slavery system's influence could be found as late as the 1980s and early 1990s, when nuohuo clans prevented marriage with qunuo or punished members who did.

Folklore
The most famous hero in Yi mythology is Zhyge Alu. He was the son of a dragon and an eagle who possessed supernatural strength, anti-magic, and anti-ghost powers. He rode a nine-winged flying horse called "long heavenly wings." He also had the help of a magical peacock and python. The magical peacock was called Shuotnyie Voplie and could deafen the ears of those who heard its cry, but if invited into one's house, would consume evil and expel leprosy. The python, called Bbahxa Ayuosse, was defeated by Zhyge Alu, who wrestled with it in the ocean after transforming into a dragon. It was said to be able to detect leprosy, cure tuberculosis, and eradicate epidemics. Like the Chinese mythological archer, Hou Yi, Zhyge Alu shoots down the suns to save the people. In the Yi religion Bimoism, Zhyge Alu aids the bimo priests in curing leprosy and fighting ghosts.

Jiegujienuo was a ghost that caused dizziness, slowness in action, dementia and anxiety. The ghost was blamed for ailments and exorcism rituals were conducted to combat the ghost. The bimo erected small sticks considered to be sacred, the kiemobbur, at the ritual site in preparation.

Torch Festival
The Torch Festival is one of the Yi people's main holidays. According to Yi legend, there were once two men of great strength, Sireabi and Atilaba. Sireabi lived in heaven while Atilaba on earth. When Sireabi heard of Atilaba's strength, he challenged Atilaba to a wrestling match. After suffering two defeats, Sireabi was killed in a bout, which greatly angered the bodhisattavas, who sent a plague of locusts to punish the earth. On the 24th day of the 6th month of the lunar calendar, Atilaba cut down many pine trees and used them as torches to kill the locusts, protecting the crops from destruction. The Torch Festival is thus held in his honor.

Music
The Yi play a number of traditional musical instruments, including large plucked and bowed string instruments, as well as wind instruments called bawu (巴乌) and mabu (马布). The Yi also play the hulu sheng, though unlike other minority groups in Yunnan, the Yi do not play the hulu sheng for courtship or love songs (aiqing). The kouxian, a small four-pronged instrument similar to the Jew's harp, is another commonly found instrument among the Liangshan Yi. Kouxian songs are most often improvised and are supposed to reflect the mood of the player or the surrounding environment. Kouxian songs can also occasionally function in the aiqing form. Yi dance is perhaps the most commonly recognized form of musical performance, as it is often performed during publicly sponsored holidays and/or festival events.

Literature
Artist Colette Fu, great-granddaughter of Long Yun has spent time from 1996 till present photographing the Yi community in Yunnan Province. Her series of pop-up books, titled We are Tiger Dragon People, includes images of many Yi groups.

Religion

Bimoism

Other religions
In Yunnan, some of the Yi have adopted Buddhism as a result of exchanges with other predominantly Buddhist ethnic groups present in Yunnan, such as the Dai and the Tibetans. The most important god of Yi Buddhism is Mahākāla, a wrathful deity found in Vajrayana and Tibetan Buddhism. In the 20th century, many Yi people in China converted to Christianity, after the arrival of Gladstone Porteous in 1904 and, later, medical missionaries such as Alfred James Broomhall, Janet Broomhall, Ruth Dix and Joan Wales of the China Inland Mission. According to missionary organization OMF International, the exact number of Yi Christians is not known. In 1991 it was reported that there were as many as 1,500,000 Yi Christians in Yunnan Province, especially in Luquan County where there are more than 20 churches.

Medicine
The Yi are known for the extent of their inter-generational transmission of traditional medicine through oral tradition and written records. Their traditional medicine system has been academically inventoried. Since the prefecture the Yi medicinal data was collected from also contains the cave containing human-infectable SARS clades and it is known that people living in the vicinity SARS caves show serological signs of past infection, it has been suggested that the Yi were repeatably exposed to coronavirus over their history, passively learned to medicinally fend off coronavirus infection centuries ago, and committed the results into their inter-generational record of medicinal indications.

Distribution

County-level distribution of the Yi 2000 census in China.

(Only includes counties or county-equivalents containing >1% of county population.)

Notable people
 He Jie (1986–), singer
 Wu Jinghua (1931-2007), former Communist Party Secretary of Tibet Autonomous Region
 Long Zhiyi (1929-2021), former Chairman of the Guizhou Provincial Committee of the CPPCC
 Zhang Chong (1900-1980), former Vice Chairman of the CPPCC
 Zhang Liyin (1989–), singer
 Jike Junyi (1988–), singer
 Long Yun (1884–1962), governor and warlord of Yunnan Province
 Lu Han (1895–1974), general and governor of Yunnan Province
 Yang Likun (1941–2000), actress

Gallery

See also
 Torch Festival
 Liangshan Yi Autonomous Prefecture
 Honghe Hani and Yi Autonomous Prefecture
 Chuxiong Yi Autonomous Prefecture
 Hani people
 Bai people
 Yiminaspis, a prehistoric fish named in honor of the Yi.
 The Art of Not Being Governed

Notes

References

Citations

Sources

 
 Cheng Xiamin. A Survey of the Demographic Problems of the Yi Nationality in the Greater and Lesser Liang Mountains. Social Sciences in China. 3: Autumn 1984, 207–231.
 Clements, Ronald. Point Me to the Skies: the amazing story of Joan Wales. (Monarch Publications, 2007), .
 Dessaint, Alain Y. Minorities of Southwest China: An Introduction to the Yi (Lolo) and Related Peoples. (New Haven: HRAF Press, 1980).
 Du Ruofu and Vip, Vincent F. Ethnic Groups in China. (Beijing: Science Press, 1993).
 Goullart, Peter. Princes of the Black Bone. (John Murray, London, 1959).
 Grimes, Barbara F. Ethnologue. (Dallas: Wycliffe Bible Translators, 1988).

 Cultural Encounters on China's Ethnic Frontiers. The History of the History of the Yi. Edited by Stevan Harrell. (Seattle: University of Washington Press, 1995).
 Perspectives on the Yi of Southwest China. Edited by Stevan Harrell. (Berkeley / Los Angeles / London: University of California Press, 2001), .
 China's Minority Nationalities. Edited by Ma Yin. (Beijing: Foreign Language Press, 1994).
 Zhang Weiwen and Zeng Qingnan. In Search of China's Minorities. (Beijing: New World Press).
 Ritual for Expelling Ghosts: A religious Classic of the Yi nationality in Liangshan Prefecture, Sichuan (The Taipei Ricci Institute, Nov. 1998), .

Further reading

 Benoît Vermander. L'enclos à moutons: un village nuosu du sud-ouest de la Chine. Paris: Les Indes savantes (2007).

 Ollone, Henri d', vicomte (1912) In Forbidden China: the d'Ollone mission, 1906–1909, China—Tibet—Mongolia; translated from the French of the second edition by Bernard Miall. Chapters II-V & VII. London: T. Fisher Unwin.
 Pollard, S. (1921) In Unknown China: Record of the Observations, Adventures and Experiences of a Pioneer Missionary During a Prolonged Sojourn Amongst the Wild and Unknown Nosu Tribe of Western China London: Seeley Service and Co. Limited.
Wang, Zhen. "Out of the Mountains: Changing Landscapes in Rural China," RCC Perspectives: Transformations in Environment and Society 2018, no. 2. doi.org/10.5282/rcc/8523.

External links

China.org.cn. "The Yi ethnic minority".
Yu-Hsiu Lu. "The Dishi septet Traditional music and dance Documentation."
Peoples.org. "Yi Peoples of China".
Yizuren.com. "Huge string instruments of the Yi".
Vermander, B. "The Yis of Liangshan Prefecture".
Vermander, B. "Nuosu Religion: Rituals, Agents and Belief".
Ayi Bamo. "The Bi-mox in The Liangshan Yi Society."
Perspectives on the Yi of Southwest China. Edited by Stevan Harrell.
Map share of ethnic by county of China

 
Ethnic groups officially recognized by China
Ethnic groups in Vietnam
Ethnic groups in Thailand
.
.
Ethnic groups in Yunnan
.